Emidio Pallotta (1803-1868) was an Italian painter and architect, active mainly in his native Tolentino in the region of Marche.

Biography
He studied in Rome under Tommaso Minardi, but returned to his native town to work under Giuseppe Lucatelli. He ran a school of drawing in Tolentino, and painted portraits of townspeople now kept in city hall. He frescoed in the Basilica di San Nicola a Tolentino. He designed the façade of the city Hall.

References

1803 births
1868 deaths
People from the Province of Macerata
19th-century Italian painters
Italian male painters
Italian neoclassical painters
19th-century Italian male artists